The 2016 Northwest Territories Scotties Tournament of Hearts was held from January 27 to 31 at the Hay River Curling Club in Hay River. The winning Kerry Galusha team represented the Northwest Territories at the 2016 Scotties Tournament of Hearts in Grande Prairie, Alberta.

Teams
The teams are listed as follows:

Round-robin standings

Round-robin results

January 27
Draw 1
Galusha 11-1 Stanley
Goucher 9-7 Browne

January 28
Draw 2
Galusha 12-3 Goucher
Browne 9-7 Stanley

Draw 3
Galusha 15-1 Browne
Stanley 10-2 Goucher

January 29
Draw 4
Goucher 10-2 Stanley
Browne 9-5 Galusha

Draw 5
Stanley 8-5 Browne
Galusha 14-1 Goucher

January 30
Draw 6
Goucher 10-9 Browne
Galusha 10-2 Stanley

Final
Sunday, January 31, 11:00 am

External links
Scores

2016 Scotties Tournament of Hearts
Curling in the Northwest Territories
South Slave Region
2016 in the Northwest Territories